Costus barbatus, also known as spiral ginger, is a perennial plant with a red inflorescence. It is one of the most commonly cultivated Costus species.

The foliage of Costus barbatus is dark green and fuzzy underneath. The long red inflorescences are complemented with bright yellow tubular flowers. Clumps spread easily and produce plants that normally get to six feet tall.

Costus barbatus is native to Costa Rica. Plants are pollinated by hummingbirds. Costus barbatus are popular as cut flowers.

References

barbatus
Flora of Costa Rica
Garden plants
Plants described in 1942